The Unforgiving World Tour was a concert tour by Dutch symphonic metal band Within Temptation in support of their fifth studio album, The Unforgiving, released by Roadrunner Records on 25 March 2011. It was their seventh major tour and their second to see them playing worldwide. The tour commenced on 10 August 2011, at the Sziget Festival, Hungary, and finished on 8 September 2013, at the Rock'n Coke Festival, in Turkey, passing mainly over Europe, with selected concerts in North America and South America. The tour helped on solidifying the band as one of mainland Europe's most successful symphonic metal acts, as it marked a major transition from club and theater to arena concerts on the continent than the previous one. On the North and South American concerts, however, the band still opted to play at smaller capacity venues. For the band's fifteenth anniversary, they held their biggest concert to date with a special presentation at the Sportpaleis, Belgium, featuring some of the band's ex-members on older songs and other special guests. The concert was later released as part of the Let Us Burn – Elements & Hydra Live in Concert live album.

Background
The tour was scheduled to start immediately following The Unforgiving's release, however, due to Sharon den Adel's third pregnancy, the originally planned dates were rescheduled to begin in August 2011. The band did, however, play 7 days at the Vrienden Van Amstel Dutch Festival in January 2011, although they only performed 3 songs at each show (Ice Queen, Faster and Mother Earth), and also made several promotional appearances on European radio stations.
On 10 August 2011, the band presented at the Sziget Festival, but The Unforgiving Tour officially started 12 August, at the Huntenpop Festival, in Ulft. This show as unique as the band performed The Unforgiving in its entirety, whilst enacting the album's concept through a new stage design, including lights, videos and other illusions. During August, the band performed at several Summer Festivals as M'era Luna and Lowlands and started an indoor tour in September, first in the North America and then crossing Europe. On early September, during their passage over Poland the album The Unforgiving reached Gold status there.

Later that month, it was announced that Guitarist Robert Westerholt would step down from touring with the band (with the exception of occasional shows) as there was no-one to look after his and vocalist Sharon den Adel's three children. Westerholt will continue to contribute on production and songwriting and will play guitar in the studio, while Stefan Helleblad will play guitar live.

In February 2012, the band brought the tour to South America, playing shows in Brazil, Mexico, Peru, Argentina and Chile. Following their March–April theatre tour, entitled Sanctuary, the band resumed The Unforgiving Tour with shows in some of the biggest European festivals in the summer of 2012, such as Sonisphere, Masters of Rock, Rock Werchter, Summerbreeze and Gods of Metal.

On 9 May 2012, the band officially announced a one-off show called "Elements" at the Sportpaleis in Antwerp in celebration of Within Temptation's 15-year anniversary. The band were accompanied by the Il Novecentro Orchestra and other special guests, including ex-band members and former Orphanage vocalist George Oosthoek. The show was sold out with fans from over 50 reported countries in attendance. The show would later appear on the Let Us Burn – Elements & Hydra Live in Concert live album.

Reception
The tour was well received worldwide. PureGrainAudio, reviewing the band's concert in Baltimore, praised "Sharon's top-notch vocals and Martijn Spierenburg's keyboarding", as well as stating that, "aside from musical embellishments, the band came across as really simple and down-to-earth", ultimately deeming it "not just a concert, but an experience." This is Not a Scene, writing about the band's Manchester show, were also positive, commenting that "it was a gig deserving to be sold out and a beautiful night for all to witness." MetalConcerts reviewed their show in São Paulo, stating that "Within Temptation exhaled technique and talent, not to mention the charisma and respect they had with those that were there."

Support
 Guild of Stags (12/08/2011, 21/09/2011–29/09/2011)
 3 (07/09/2011–13/09/2011)
 Triggerfinger (06/10/2011–08/10/2011, 15/10/2011–28/10/2011)
 The Cannibal Queen (10/10/2011, 14/10/2011)
 Kandria (11/10/2011–12/10/2011)
 Anneke Van Giersbergen & Her Band (04/11/2011–25/11/2011)

Setlist

Tour dates

 A Cancelled due to heavy weather.
 B Cancelled due to scheduling problems.
 C Cancelled due to heavy weather.
 D Cancelled due to scheduling problems.
 E Cancelled due to scheduling problems.

Extra shows

Setlist

{{hidden
| headercss = background: #ccccff; font-size: 100%; width: 65%;
| contentcss = text-align: left; font-size: 100%; width: 75%;
| header = Saarbrücken Setlist (18 August 2012)
| content = 
 "Shot in the Dark" (from The Unforgiving, 2011)
 "In the Middle of the Night" (from The Unforgiving, 2011)
 "Faster" (from The Unforgiving, 2011)
 "Fire and Ice" (from The Unforgiving, 2011)
 "Ice Queen" (from Mother Earth, 2001)
 "Our Solemn Hour" (from The Heart of Everything, 2007)
 "Stand My Ground" (from The Silent Force, 2004)
 "Sinéad" (from The Unforgiving, 2011)
 "What Have You Done" (from The Heart of Everything, 2007)
 "Iron" (from The Unforgiving, 2011)
 "Angels" (from The Silent Force, 2004)
 "Murder" <small>(from The Unforgiving1', 2011)</small>
 "See Who I Am" (from The Silent Force, 2004)
 "Where Is the Edge" (from The Unforgiving, 2011)
 "Jillian (I'd Give My Heart)" (from The Silent Force, 2004)
Encore #2
 "Never-Ending Story" (from Mother Earth, 2001)
 "Mother Earth" (from Mother Earth, 2001)
}}

Personnel

Within Temptation
Sharon den Adel – vocals
Robert Westerholt – rhythm guitar (from 10 August to 13 September 2011 and at Elements)
Stefan Helleblad – rhythm guitar (21 September onwards)
Ruud Jolie – lead guitar
Martijn Spierenburg – keyboards
Jeroen van Veen – bass guitar
Mike Coolen – drums

Guest musicians

Anneke van Giersbergen – featured vocals on "Fire and Ice" on 24 and 25 November 2011 and on "Somewhere" on 10 July 2012.
George Oosthoek – featured vocals on "Candles" at ElementsIvar de Graaf – acoustic guitar on "Never-Ending Story" and drums on "Summertime Sadness" at ElementsMartijn Westerholt – keyboards on "Candles" at ElementsMichiel Papenhove – guitars on "Candles" at ElementsIsabella Scholten – featured vocals on "Our Farewell" at Elements''

References

External links
Within Temptation Official Website
Within Temptation Tour Dates
Within Temptation Tour Archive

2011 concert tours
2012 concert tours
2013 concert tours
Within Temptation concert tours
Concert tours of Europe
Concert tours of Germany
Concert tours of the United Kingdom
Concert tours of the United States